Over the Edge is a 2004 album from American rock singer Mickey Thomas. Writers on the album include Jack Blades, Neal Schon, Jonathan Cain, Freddy Curci and Steven Cristol.

Track listing 
 "Over The Edge"
 "One World"
 "Thief"
 "Surrender"
 "Eyes Wide Open"
 "Forest For The Trees"
 "The Man In Between"
 "Cover Me"
 "Turn Away"
 "Glory Day"

References

2004 albums
Mickey Thomas (singer) albums